Mario Ravasio (born 19 July 1998) is an Italian football player. He plays for  club Lucchese as a forward.

Club career

AlbinoLeffe 
On 19 March 2016, Ravasio made his professional debut, in Serie C, for AlbinoLeffe, as a substitute replacing Riccardo Stronati in the 68th minute of a 3–1 away defeat against FeralpiSalò. On 9 April he played his first match for AlbinoLeffe as a starter, a 2–0 away defeat against Renate, he was replaced by Pablo Ezequiel Banegas in the 60th minute. On 30 April 2017, Rovasio scored his first professional goal in the 10th minute of a 1–1 away draw against Venezia. On 30 July 2017, Rovasio played his first match in Coppa Italia and he scored in a 3–1 away win over Giana Erminio, one week later he scored again in a 2–1 away defeat against Cittadella.

Lucchese 
On 1 September 2022, Ravasio signed a one-year contract with Lucchese.

References

External links 
 

1998 births
Living people
Footballers from Bergamo
Italian footballers
Serie C players
U.C. AlbinoLeffe players
Lucchese 1905 players
Association football forwards